Barbara Griffiths (born 20 May 1972) is a British former professional tennis player.

Biography
Griffiths, who comes from Middlesex, broke through for her first ITF titles in 1989, winning both the singles and doubles at Dublin.

At the 1991 Wimbledon Championships, Griffiths received a wildcard to compete in the women's singles main draw. The highest ranked player in the draw, Griffiths was beaten in the first round by former quarter-finalist Claudia Kohde-Kilsch, but reached the second round of the women's doubles, partnering Jane Wood.

ITF finals

Singles (1–1)

Doubles (3–1)

References

External links
 
 

1972 births
Living people
British female tennis players
Tennis people from Greater London
People from Hillingdon
English female tennis players